Vermont's 2nd congressional district is an obsolete district. It was created upon Vermont's admission as the 14th State in 1791. It was eliminated after the 1930 Census.

List of members representing the district 
Vermont had district representation upon admission as the 14th State on March 4, 1791. Vermont returned to a single At-large district after losing its second Representative following redistricting resulting from the 1930 Census.

References

 Congressional Biographical Directory of the United States 1774–present

02
Former congressional districts of the United States
1791 establishments in Vermont
1933 disestablishments in Vermont
Constituencies established in 1791
Constituencies disestablished in 1933